The Republic of Finland and the North Atlantic Treaty Organization (NATO) have a close relationship. Finland is one of six members of the European Union that are not members of NATO. Finland has had formal relations with NATO since 1994, when it joined the Partnership for Peace programme. The country maintains positive relations with the organisation.  While the country has historically maintained its neutrality, and due to complicated relations with Russia, possibility of membership has been a topic of debate in the country since the end of the Cold War. Following the 2022 Russian invasion of Ukraine, the debate turned in favour of NATO membership, and the country officially applied to join NATO on 18 May 2022.

On 5 July 2022, NATO signed the accession protocol for Finland to join the alliance.
If Finland joins NATO, the  border with Russia will become a new NATO–Russia border.

Background 
At the end of World War II, Finland had to cut its ties with Germany with which it had allied against the Soviet Union in the Continuation War. Following the war, foreign policy was guided by the so-called Paasikivi–Kekkonen line, which aimed to ensure Finland's survival as an independent sovereign, democratic, and capitalist state next to the communist Soviet Union. This was to be achieved by maintaining good enough relations with the Soviet Union to avoid war with its eastern neighbor. The Finnish government refused foreign aid from the United States under the Marshall Plan due to pressure from the Soviet Union. Shortly afterwards, the YYA Treaty was concluded between Finland and the Soviet Union. The Cold War was marked by so-called "Finlandization", in which Finland retained its nominal independence on internal affairs, while its foreign policy was limited to avoid conflicts with the Soviet Union's foreign policy. As a result, it took neutral stances to stay out of great power conflicts, and refrained from joining NATO, the European Communities or other institutions which were established following the war by the Western democratic states, as well as the Soviet-led Warsaw Pact. During the peak of the Cold War the Finnish government made a conscious effort to increase defence capabilities, to ensure a strong deterrent for any potential invasion. From 1968 onwards, the Finnish government adopted the doctrine of territorial defence, which requires the use of large land areas to delay and wear out a potential aggressor. This was complemented by the concept of total defence, which calls for the use of all resources of society for national defence in times of crisis.

Co-operation 

Finland participates in nearly all sub-areas of the Partnership for Peace programme, and has provided peacekeeping forces to both the Afghanistan and Kosovo missions. Finland maintains close relations with NATO and purchases military equipment from members of the alliance, including F-35 Lightning II aircraft, and newly procured equipment must follow NATO standards.

However, Haglund emphasized that this memorandum would not be a step towards membership. The agreement, signed in September 2014, allows NATO and Finland to hold joint exercises on Finnish soil and permits assistance from NATO members in situations such as "disasters, disruptions, and threats to security". As such, Finland (and Sweden) participated in the 2015 NATO-led Arctic Challenge Exercise.

Membership

History 
Following the dissolution of the Soviet Union between 1988 and 1991, the threat posed to Finland's independence was diminished. NATO emphasised its Open Door Policy to admitting new members, and many former Eastern Bloc and post-Soviet states joined the alliance in the 1990s and 2000s.  However, across multiple subsequent governments the Finnish position was that joining NATO was not necessary, and it was preferable to retain an independent defence policy, though if conditions changed the country had the right to exercise the option to join NATO.  Removing barriers to effectively exercising the option to join an alliance (for example, by increasing interopability) is a part of this policy.  The country did move away from neutrality during this period though, joining the European Union in 1995 which required adopting its Common Foreign and Security Policy.

The possibility of Finland's membership in NATO was one of the most important issues debated in relation to the Finnish presidential election of 2006.  The main opposition candidate (and current president) Sauli Niinistö, of the National Coalition Party, supported Finland joining a "more European" NATO. Fellow right-winger Henrik Lax of the Swedish People's Party likewise supported the concept. On the other side, president Tarja Halonen of the Social Democratic Party opposed changing the status quo, as did most other candidates in the election. Her victory and re-election to the post of president put the issue of a NATO membership for Finland on hold the duration of her term.

In 2007, Finland made various technical preparations of the Finnish Defence Forces for membership, with the then Defence Minister Jyri Häkämies eager to pursue NATO membership.  The government preferred to wait until after the negotiations of the new EU treaty were concluded before reviewing their policy on NATO, to determine if it included a new EU-level defence agreement.  However, public interest in the issue decreased in subsequent years.

Finnish think tank , which has regularly commissioned opinion polls on NATO membership, noted in its 2015 report a downward trend in the percent opposed that started in 1998, including a steep decline after the 2012 presidential election. In March 2014, during Russia's annexation of Crimea, one survey showed only 22 percent supported membership, though a second showed that 53 percent would support membership if Finnish leadership recommended it. Support for a military alliance with neighbor Sweden was also high, at 54 percent, and Finland could possibly seek an enlarged role for NORDEFCO. Finnish Minister of Defence Carl Haglund suggested that a referendum on NATO membership could be held sometime after the 2015 parliamentary election.

In January 2022, Prime Minister Sanna Marin said that Finland reserved the option of applying NATO membership if it chooses to do so, but she said it was "very unlikely" it would happen during her term as prime minister. On 24 February 2022, in response to the Russian invasion of Ukraine, she reiterated that while Finland was "not currently facing an immediate military threat", joining NATO was still a possibility, noting that "the debate on NATO membership in Finland will change". On 25 February, a Russian Foreign Ministry spokesperson threatened Finland and Sweden with "military and political consequences" if they attempted to join NATO. Both countries had attended the emergency NATO summit as members of NATO's Partnership for Peace and both had condemned the invasion and had provided assistance to Ukraine. Following a meeting on 1 March 2022 to discuss whether to apply to become full members of NATO, Prime Minister Sanna Marin stated that no decision had been made on the issue yet, saying that "such an important question needs to be dealt with thoroughly".

Opinion polling following the invasion showed an unprecedented increase in support for joining NATO among Finns, with a clear majority in favour. Additionally, multiple citizens' initiatives on the subject got the required 50,000 signatures, requiring the Parliament of Finland to consider the matter. President Niinistö characterised the polling as demonstrating sufficient popular support for an application. Prime Minister Marin suggested that the decision process must be concluded in the spring and in a matter of "weeks, not months".

On 13 April, the Ministry for Foreign Affairs produced a report on the international security landscape and on the foreign and defence policy options available to Finland, which is expected to form the basis of the debate on NATO membership. The report identifies that the Russian invasion has changed the long-term European security environment and made it more difficult to predict and act in the near term. It does not explicitly take a position on NATO membership, but does state that the present security arrangements are insufficient and that membership would increase stability, although there is no immediate threat. As a member, Finland would not be obliged to accept foreign bases or the presence of nuclear weapons on its territory; Finland's defence budget would rise by 1 to 1.5%. Helsingin Sanomat assessed it as a positive evaluation of NATO membership.

European Union membership 

Finland became a member of the European Union in 1995, joined NATO's Partnership for Peace program on 9 May 1994, applied for NATO membership on 18 May 2022 together with Sweden.
Since the entry into force of the Treaty of Lisbon in 2009, the EU mutual solidarity clause applies to Finland along with other EU member states:

Article 42.2 specifies however that NATO shall be the main forum for the implementation of collective self-defence for EU member states that are also NATO members. The other EU member states that are outside NATO and consequently resort to the EU's Common Security and Defence Policy (CSDP, which has a much smaller structures and capabilities than NATO's command structure) for the implementation of collective self-defence, are Austria, Cyprus, Ireland, Malta and Sweden.

Political positions 
Prior to the 2022 Russian invasion of Ukraine, the National Coalition Party and Swedish People's Party of Finland supported NATO membership, and the other parties were neutral or opposed to varying degrees. In 2016, the party conference of the National Coalition Party agreed that Finland should apply for membership "in the next few years". In the vision of the Swedish People's Party of Finland set out in the same year, Finland will be a NATO member in 2025. Many individual politicians have advocated for NATO as well, including the current President Sauli Niinistö and former Prime Minister Alexander Stubb, as well as former President Martti Ahtisaari, who has argued that Finland should join all the organizations supported by other Western democracies in order "to shrug off once and for all the burden of Finlandization". Two other former presidents from the Social Democratic Party, Tarja Halonen and Mauno Koivisto, have publicly opposed the idea, arguing that NATO membership would deteriorate Finland's relations with Russia. The Left Alliance has been the party most opposed to joining NATO; when they entered into coalition with the SDP in 2019, they made clear that any movement towards entering a military alliance would lead to the Left Alliance leaving the cabinet. However, the party's position changed following the invasion, with chair Li Andersson calling for a thoughtful, society-wide discussion and evaluation of the possibility of applying to join NATO, and later confirming that the party had decided not to resign from the government if an application is submitted. After the invasion and a large change in popular opinion, the leadership of the Center Party and Finns Party also changed position to support NATO membership.

NATO opinion 
NATO has consistently maintained its "open door policy". Secretary General Jens Stoltenberg expected that the member states would "warmly welcome Finland as a member of NATO". He has said that "Finnish membership would make NATO stronger", identifying the country's military capability and commitment to remaining a democratic society as assets.

Foreign opinion 

Finland has received critical feedback from Russia for even considering the possibility of joining NATO, with a 2009 study suggesting this could have repercussions for Russia's relations with the EU and NATO as a whole. Following the 2008 Russo-Georgian War, Finnish Prime Minister Matti Vanhanen reiterated that Finland had no plans to join NATO, and stated that the main lesson of the war was the need for closer ties to Russia. In a June 2014 interview in the Finnish newspaper Hufvudstadsbladet, Vladimir Putin's personal envoy Sergey Alexandrovich Markov accused Finland of extreme "Russophobia" and suggested that Finland joining NATO could start World War III. In July 2016, Putin stated on a visit to Finland that Russia would increase the number of troops on the Finnish border if Finland were to join NATO. He also warned that NATO would "fight to the last Finn against Russia".

After the 2022 Russian invasion of Ukraine and the radical shift in Finnish positions towards membership of NATO, Maria Zakharova and Dmitry Medvedev warned that joining NATO would have consequences for Finland, including the deployment of nuclear weapons; Russian newspaper Izvestia reported that the Finnish lease on the Saimaa canal may be terminated.

She predicts that Russia will begin a hybrid campaign to influence the Finnish decision process, including cyber attacks, with increasing escalation if Finland moves closer to membership.

Russia has halted providing natural gas to neighbouring Finland, which has angered Moscow by applying for NATO membership, after the Nordic country refused to pay supplier Gazprom in roubles. Russia's leading exporter of electricity to the Nordic market, RAO Nordic, has announced that it has decided to cut electricity supplies to Finland due to payment arrears.

Polling 
Polls asking the Finnish public whether they support or oppose joining NATO have been regularly conducted. This table includes only unconditional questions; other polled topics include support for joining NATO should Sweden also join, and support for joining NATO if the Finnish government officially recommends membership, both of which generally increased public support for joining.

According to Helsingin Sanomat's data between 20–26 June 2022, 70% of them stated that Finland would not meet Turkey's demands, and 14% stated that Finland would meet Turkey's demands.
According to Ilta-Sanomat's data, between January 30 and February 1, 53% of Finns stated that they wanted to join NATO without waiting for Sweden to join together, 28% stated that they wanted to wait to join NATO with Sweden, and 19% were undecided.

Application 

 

 

On 12 May 2022, Finnish president Sauli Niinistö and prime minister Sanna Marin announced in a joint press conference that they were in favour of seeking NATO membership "without delay".  On 15 May 2022, Niinistö and Marin announced that the president and Ministerial Committee on Foreign and Security Policy had adopted a report endorsing Finland joining NATO, beginning the formal constitutional process of applying. A Finnish application had been anticipated following the 2022 Russian invasion of Ukraine degrading the European security environment, and a significant shift in Finnish public opinion on the desirability of membership.

The government's proposal to join was approved in parliament by 188 votes to 8 on 17 May, The next day, Finland submitted an official application to NATO in Brussels jointly with Sweden; the organisation considered the applications and then negotiations began. Negotiations were expected to take weeks, after which Finland would participate in NATO activities at all levels on a provisional basis during the ratification period. With negotiations concluded and a reconfirmation of the applicant's intent to join, the accession protocol will need ratification by all the existing NATO member states; this was estimated to take between four months and a year. After ratification is completed, the Parliament of Finland must pass an Act to formally bring the accession into force.

During the interval between initiating an application and membership entering into force, Finland would be at risk. Jens Stoltenberg, NATO Secretary General, said that Finland could join the alliance "very quickly" and that there would be some degree of protection for Finland during that period. Non-binding security promises have been received from the United Kingdom and the United States, and the other reports claimed that further promises would be received from the other Nordic countries as well as France and Germany.

Croatia's president Zoran Milanović has stated that his country should block ratification of Finland's accession until electoral reform measures are implemented in neighbouring Bosnia and Herzegovina, though the Foreign Minister has expressed the government's support for any application.
The European Union announced its support for Finland and Sweden's NATO membership.
Turkish president Recep Tayyip Erdoğan voiced his opposition to Finland and Sweden joining NATO, saying that it would be "impossible" for Turkey to support their application while the two countries allow groups which Turkey classifies as terrorist organizations, including the Kurdish militant groups Kurdistan Workers' Party (PKK), Kurdistan Communities Union (KCK), Democratic Union Party (Syria) (PYD), and People's Defense Units (YPG) and the supporters of Fethullah Gülen, a US-based Muslim cleric accused by Turkey of orchestrating a failed 2016 Turkish coup d'état attempt, to operate on their territory. (The PKK is on the European Union's list of terrorist organizations.) Turkey has requested the extradition of alleged PKK members from the Nordic countries. In addition, the Turkish government has demanded that the arms embargo imposed by the Finnish and Swedish governments in response to its operations against the YPG in Syria be lifted. Turkey's demands for extradition of Kurdish and other political dissidents has been met with hostility by Kurdish activists and some human rights organizations, due to Turkey's poor human rights record and suppression of the Kurdish minority in Turkey. On 17 May 2022, German Chancellor Olaf Scholz called on Turkey to approve Finland and Sweden's NATO membership. On 18 May 2022, Turkey quickly prevented Finland and Sweden from starting NATO membership negotiations. On 19 May 2022, Finland and Sweden announced that they could address Turkey's security concerns. On the same day, Finnish President Sauli Niinistö and Former Swedish Prime Minister Magdalena Andersson announced that they were always ready for talks with Turkey and always condemned terrorism. On 21 May 2022, Finnish President Sauli Niinistö, after a phone call with Turkish President Recep Tayyip Erdoğan, stated that Finland is ready for dialogue with Turkey on NATO membership and has always condemned terrorism. On May 24, 2022, Finland and Sweden decided to send a delegation to meet with Turkey. Jukka Salovaara from Finland, Oscar Stenström from Sweden, İbrahim Kalın and Sedat Önal from Turkey are serving in the memorandum negotiations.
Opposition parties CHP and HDP in Turkey announced that they support the membership of Finland and Sweden. The ruling parties in Turkey, the AKP and MHP have announced that they will not support the membership of Finland and Sweden. However, Niinistö stated in June that his country would not move forward with their application without Sweden, and that the two countries would join NATO "hand in hand".

Speaking later, İbrahim Kalın, spokesman for Erdoğan, said that approving Finnish membership was not being ruled out, but that the status of these groups was "a matter of national security for Turkey" and that negotiation would be required. However, after Kalın's statement, Erdoğan reiterated his threat to block Finland's and Sweden's membership applications. NATO leadership and the United States said they were confident Turkey would not hold up the two countries accession process. Canadian Foreign Minister Mélanie Joly also held talks with Turkey to convince the Turkish government of the need for the two Nordic nations integration. On May 21, Erdoğan and Sauli Niinistö had a phone call to discuss Finland's NATO bid, Niinistö reiterated Finland's condemnation of terrorism in all forms. Spokesperson İbrahim Kalın, who led the talks on behalf of Turkey, stated after the first meeting in Ankara that the process would not progress until Turkey's expectations were met and they did not feel any time pressure on them. After a delegation consisting of Swedish and Finnish diplomats held talks on the matter with its Turkish counterparts, Erdoğan repeated that he would not consent to their accession bid as the same day the talks were held in Ankara, Salih Muslim, who is considered a terrorist by Erdoğan, appeared on Swedish television. Nationalist Movement Party leader Devlet Bahçeli suggested that a scenario in which Turkey would leave NATO should be considered an option, in which case a new military alliance could be founded. In late May 2022, opposition leader Kemal Kılıçdaroğlu argued that in case the accession row persisted and AKP and MHP decided to close the Inçirlik Air Base, the CHP would support this.

At the 2022 Madrid summit on 28 June, Niinistö, Swedish Prime Minister Magdalena Andersson, and Erdoğan signed an agreement to address Turkey's security concerns, and Niinistö announced that Turkey had agreed to support membership of NATO for Finland and Sweden. While NATO members unanimously agreed to formally invite the countries to join the following day and the accession protocols for Sweden and Finland to join the alliance were signed on 5 July, Erdogan reiterated his threat to veto their membership, stating that he expected the applicant countries to meet their obligations under the agreement before Turkey's parliament would consider approving their accession protocol. Finland, Sweden and Turkey held their first trilateral memorandum meeting on 26 August 2022 in Vantaa, Finland. The second memorandum meeting between Finland, Sweden and Turkey was held on 25 November 2022 in Stockholm, Sweden. 
The third meeting of the Finland, Sweden and Turkey tripartite memorandum meeting will be held on 9 March 2023 in Brussels, the capital of Belgium.
Turkey has announced that it will not approve NATO membership in the Turkish Grand National Assembly if Finland and Sweden do not fulfill their triple memorandum commitments.  On 8 December 2022, at a press conference he gave with his Turkish counterpart Hulusi Akar during his visit to Turkey, Finnish Defense Minister Antti Kaikkonen stated that Finland has always condemned terrorism, Finland is in full solidarity with Turkey in the fight against terrorism.
On 26 August 2022, Jukka Salovaara, chief negotiator responsible for Finland's NATO membership, said in a statement after the tripartite memorandum meeting in Vantaa that they are in deep consensus with Turkey.
By November, Finland's NATO membership had been ratified by 28 out of 30 member states, with only Hungary and Turkey yet to complete their procedures. During the process of application, Sweden held elections resulting in a center-right government that pledged to continue the NATO process, reaffirming a united front with Finland's application, and suggesting that they would be more able to meet Turkish requirements. On 24 November 2022 Hungary's Prime Minister Viktor Orban announced that he supported Sweden and Finland's accession to NATO, promising Hungary will ratify NATO membership in January. Later, on 13 December, Gergely Gulyás, Orban's chief of staff, stated that the Hungarian legislature would start debating the ratification process of Sweden and Finland's NATO accession 20 February 2023. On 8 January 2023, Finland's Minister of Foreign Affairs, Pekka Haavisto, told reporters that "Finland is not in such a rush to join NATO that we can't wait for Sweden to get the green light," Haavisto also stated that representatives from the Swedish and Finnish parliaments are expected to visit Ankara in January, with another meeting between the three countries scheduled for the Spring.
On January 23, 2023, Turkish Defense Minister Hulusi Akar announced that Turkey fully fulfilled the Turkey–Finland–Sweden tripartite memorandum, while Finland and Sweden did not. In addition, Akar announced that they expect Finland and Sweden to fully comply with the triple memorandum.
On 24 January 2023, Finnish Foreign Minister Pekka Haavisto announced that the trilateral memorandum talks with Finland, Sweden and Turkey would likely be suspended until after the parliamentary and presidential elections in Turkey.

Finland, Sweden and Turkey tripartite memorandum meetings were canceled indefinitely upon Turkey's request. The third meeting of the Finland, Sweden, Turkey tripartite memorandum was to be held in Brussels, the capital of Belgium, in February.
On 1 February 2023, President Recep Tayyip Erdoğan announced that Turkey had a positive view of Finland's NATO membership and not Sweden's NATO membership, due to Sweden allowing a demonstration by far-right politician, Rasmus Paludan, wherein he burnt the Islamic holy book, the Quran.  On 1 March 2023 the Parliament of Finland approved Finland's accession to NATO by a vote of 184 in favor and 7 opposed.

In March 2023, Jens Stoltenberg pushed for Hungary and Turkey to finalize the accession of Finland and Sweden by the July summit. On 15 March, Finnish President Sauli Niinistö announced that Turkey had made a decision on Finland's application and had invited him to meet with President Recep Tayyip Erdoğan in Istanbul with both Erdoğan and Turkish officials indicating that Finland's application would be approved. Additionally, Turkish officials stated that it was "high likely" that Finland's application would be approved in mid-April, prior to the Turkish general election. Turkish officials also stated that Finland's bid would be approved independently from that of Sweden. Erdoğan publicly announced on 17 March that he would drop his opposition to Finland joining the military alliance, stating a goal of formalizing the ratification of Finland's entry into NATO prior to the 2023 Turkish general election.

On 17 March 2023, it was announced that Hungary's legislature will vote on the ratification of Finland's NATO accession on 27 March 2023, and that parliamentarians of the ruling party Fidesz would unanimously support Finland's accession to NATO.

Timeline

The ratification process began with the invitation of Finland and Sweden to become members at the NATO summit in Madrid. Member negotiations were held on 4 July 2022, and the Accession Protocols were signed in Brussels on 5 July 2022.

Ratification process

Note

Finland's foreign relations with NATO member states

See also 
 Foreign relations of Finland 
 Foreign relations of NATO 
 Enlargement of NATO 
 Partnership for Peace
 European Union–NATO relations 
 Finland–Sweden relations
 Sweden–NATO relations

References

Bibliography

External links 
Official website of Finland's mission to NATO
Relations with Finland – NATO website

 
Finland–NATO relations 
NATO
NATO relations